The Sri Lanka women's national cricket team represents Sri Lanka in international women's cricket. One of eight teams competing in the ICC Women's Championship (the highest level of the sport), the team is organised by Sri Lanka Cricket (SLC), a full member of the International Cricket Council (ICC).

Sri Lanka made its One Day International (ODI) debut in 1997, against the Netherlands, and later in the year participated in the 1997 World Cup in India. The team has since participated in every edition of the World Cup, with a fifth-place finish at the 2013 event being its best performance. At the World Twenty20, Sri Lanka has likewise played at every tournament, although the team has never progressed past the first round. Sri Lanka played in its first and only Test match to date in April 1998, defeating Pakistan.

1990s

Sri Lanka's international debut came in 1997 with a three match ODI series against The Netherlands, which they lost 2–1. This was part of their preparation for the World Cup in India the following month, in which they reached the quarter finals, losing to England. The following year they hosted a tour by Pakistan, winning the three ODIs as well as what was the first Test match for both countries. It remains Sri Lanka's sole Test match. The Netherlands toured Sri Lanka again in 1999, and this time the Sri Lankans were much more successful, winning all five ODIs.

2000s

Sri Lanka finished sixth in the 2000 World Cup, and their next international engagement was against Pakistan at home in 2002, winning all six ODIs. They also won all six ODIs in an away series against the West Indies the following year.

In 2004 they hosted the inaugural Women's Asia Cup, which was reduced to a series against India after the withdrawal of Pakistan. They lost the series. The following year they again finished sixth in the World Cup. In 2005/06, they visited Pakistan to take part in the second Asia Cup, finishing as runners up to India.

2010s

In 2014, allegations of sexual abuse by Sri Lanka officials surfaced. Some players were apparently compelled to perform sexual favours for the officials in order to earn and/or keep their place in the national team.

On 2013 Women's Cricket World Cup, Sri Lanka beat England in a pool match, which was a major upset in Women's ODI history. England are world's top ranked team and Sri Lanka is in underdog status, but this win gave a full of attention in World Cricket. Sri Lanka women next beat India women and finally they finished as fifth in the rankings.

On 8 August 2018, after a five-year gap since his previous spell in charge, Harsha de Silva was reappointed as the head coach of the team by the SLC.

History

Tournament History

World Cup
1973 to 1993: Did not participate 
1997: Quarter finals
2000: 6th place
2005: 6th place
2009: 8th place
2013: 5th place
2017: 7th place
2022ː Did not qualify

T20 World Cup
 2009: Group stage
 2010: Group stage
 2012: Group stage
 2014: Group stage
 2016: Group stage
 2018: Group stage
 2020: Group stage
 2023: Group stage

Asia Cup
2004: Runners up
2005–06: Runners up
2006: Runners up
2008: Runners up
2012: Semifinals
2016: 3rd
2018: 4th
2022: Runners up

Asian Games 
2010: DNP
2014: Bronze

Honours

ACC
Women's Asia Cup:
 Runners-up (5): 2004, 2005–06, 2006, 2008, 2022

Others
Asian Games
 Bronze Medal (1): 2014
South Asian Games
 Silver Medal (1): 2019

Records and Statistics 

International Match Summary — Sri Lanka Women

Last updated 19 February 2023

Women's Test cricket

Highest team total: 305/9d, v Pakistan on 17 April 1998 at Colts Cricket Club, Colombo.
Highest individual score: 105*, Chamani Seneviratna v Pakistan on 17 April 1998 at Colts Cricket Club, Colombo.
Best innings bowling: 5/31, Chamani Seneviratna v Pakistan on 17 April 1998 at Colts Cricket Club, Colombo.

Women's Test record versus other nations

Records complete to Women's Test #106. Last updated 20 April 1998.

Women's One-Day International

Highest team total: 284/5, v India on 5 February 2013 at Brabourne Stadium, Mumbai.
Highest individual score: 178*, Chamari Athapaththu v Australia on 29 June 2017 at Bristol County Ground, Bristol.
Best innings bowling: 5/2, Suthershini Sivanantham v Pakistan on 22 January 2002 at Moors Sports Club Ground, Colombo.

Most ODI runs for Sri Lanka Women 

Most ODI wickets for Sri Lanka Women 

Highest individual innings in Women's ODI

Best bowling figures in an innings in Women's ODI

WODI record versus other nations

Records complete to WODI #1277. Last updated 5 June 2022.

Women's T20I cricket 

Highest team total: 182/4, v Scotland on 18 January 2022 at Kinrara Academy Oval, Kuala Lumpur.
Highest individual innings: 113, Chamari Athapaththu  v Australia on 29 September 2019 at North Sydney Oval, Sydney.
Best innings bowling: 4/9, Shashikala Siriwardene v Pakistan on 30 March 2018 at Nondescripts Cricket Club Ground, Colombo.

Most WT20I runs for Sri Lanka Women 

Most WT20I wickets for Sri Lanka Women 

WT20I record versus other nations

Records complete to WT20I #1372. Last updated 19 February 2023.

Squad
This lists all the players who were named in the squad for India women's cricket team tour of Sri Lanka 2022.

See also

List of Sri Lanka women ODI cricketers
List of Sri Lanka women Twenty20 International cricketers
List of Sri Lanka women Test cricketers
Sri Lankan men's cricket team

References

 
Women's cricket in Sri Lanka
Women's national cricket teams
Women
1997 establishments in Sri Lanka